Polanów  is a town in northern Poland, located in the Koszalin County of the West Pomeranian Voivodeship. It has 2,949 inhabitants (2017).

History 
The settlement was first mentioned in 13th century, and was granted town rights in 1313 under Lübeck law.

The town was completely destroyed during World War II, in fires set by victorious Red Army soldiers.

Points of interest 
 Gołogóra transmitter, a facility for FM-/TV-broadcasting with 2 guyed masts, which are 271 respectively 115 metres tall
 Historic churches: Church of the Assumption, Exaltation of the Holy Cross church
 Zalew Polanowski (artificial lake)
 Historical watermill complex

Town twinning
Polanów is twinned with:
  Gedern, Germany
  Rothenklempenow, Germany

Notable people 
 Julius Leopold Pagel (1851–1912) a German physician and historian of medicine.

References

External links

 Official town webpage

Cities and towns in West Pomeranian Voivodeship
Koszalin County